Grahame Brinkworth Baker, AKC was Dean of Ontario from 1977 to 1991.

Bakerwas educated at King's College London and ordained in 1956. After a curacy in Wandsworth he held incumbencies in British Columbia  before his appointment as Dean.

References

Alumni of King's College London
Associates of King's College London
Deans of Ontario